Fateh Nagar railway station is an Indian railway station in Hyderabad. It serves mainly the MMTS trains.

Lines
Multi-Modal Transport System, Hyderabad
Secunderabad–Falaknuma route (SF Line)

References

MMTS stations in Hyderabad